Elections were held in Illinois on Tuesday, November 2, 1948.

Primaries were held April 13, 1948.

Election information

Turnout
In the primaries, 1,649,655 ballots were cast (745,645 Democratic and 904,010 Republican).

In the general election, 4,075,090 ballots were cast.

Federal elections

United States President 

Illinois voted for the Democratic ticket of Harry S. Truman and Alben W. Barkley.

United States Senate 

Incumbent Republican Charles W. Brooks lost reelection to Democrat Paul Douglas.

United States House 

All 26 Illinois seats in the United States House of Representatives were up for election in 1948.

Illinois had redistricted before this election, eliminating its  at-large district.

State elections

Governor

Incumbent Governor Dwight H. Green, a Republican seeking a third term, lost reelection to Democrat Adlai Stevenson II.

Stevenson's victory was regarded as a surprise upset, and his margin of victory of 572,067 votes was, at the time, record breaking for an Illinois gubernatorial election.

General election

Lieutenant Governor

Incumbent Lieutenant Governor Hugh W. Cross, a Republican, did not seek reelection to a third term. Democrat Sherwood Dixon was elected to succeed him in office.

Democratic primary

Republican primary

General election

Attorney General 

 
Incumbent Attorney General George F. Barrett, a Republican running for a third term, lost to Democrat Ivan A. Elliott

Democratic primary

Republican primary

General election

Secretary of State 

The Secretary of State Edward J. Barrett, a Democrat, was  reelected to a second term.

Democratic primary

Republican primary
Former Illinois Treasurer and incumbent congressman William Stratton won the Republican primary, running unopposed.

General election

Auditor of Public Accounts 

Incumbent Auditor of Public Accounts Arthur C. Lueder, a Republican, did not seek reelection to a third term. Democrat Benjamin O. Cooper was elected to succeed him in office.

Democratic primary

Republican primary

General election

Treasurer 

Incumbent first-term Treasurer Richard Yates Rowe, a Republican, did not seek reelection, instead opting to run for lieutenant governor. Democrat Ora Smith was elected to succeed him in office.

Democratic primary

Republican primary

General election

State Senate
Seats of the Illinois Senate were up for election in 1948. Republicans retained control of the chamber.

State House of Representatives
Seats in the Illinois House of Representatives were up for election in 1948. Democrats flipped control of the chamber.

Trustees of University of Illinois

An election was held for three of the nine seats for Trustees of University of Illinois. All three Democratic nominees won. The election was for six-year terms.

4,078,146 ballots were cast in the election.

All three who were elected had never before held office as Trustees of the University of Illinois. Incumbent Republican Chester R. Davis lost reelection.  Fellow Republican incumbents Martin Gerard Luken Sr. and Frank Hotchkiss McKelvey were not nominated for what would have been a second term.

Judicial elections

Special judicial elections were held to fill vacancies.

Circuit Courts

Tenth Judicial Circuit (vacancy caused by resignation of Joseph E. Daily)

Thirteenth Judicial Circuit (vacancy caused by death of Frank H. Hayes) 
This election was held on November 2, 1948.

Local elections
Local elections were held.

References

 
Illinois
Adlai Stevenson II